Pups Is Pups is a two-reel comedy short subject, part of the Our Gang (Little Rascals) series. It was produced and directed by Robert F. McGowan for Hal Roach, and originally released to theatres by M-G-M in 1930. It was the 100th (12th talking) Our Gang short that was released and the first in the 1930-1931 season.

Plot
Wheezer attempts to find his puppies after they run off and travel across the city. At the same time, the rest of the gang crash a high-society dog conformation show where Farina is working as a page. The kids bring all manner of wild animal pets (frogs, turtles, mice, ducks, and even a pig) into the show, and cause commotion and fear among the ritzy attendees. Because of the commotion the kids cause, Farina is fired.

Meanwhile, Wheezer continues searching for his pups, who run toward a bell — any bell — they hear; he says, "they think they're gonna get dinner." They hear a goat's bell, a fire engine bell, an ice cream truck bell, and a huge church bell, which Wheezer himself rings in a desperate attempt to find the pups. He sits on the curb dejected until the pups, who did hear it, scamper up to him for a happy reunion.

Tying the two sub-plots together is a running gag in which first-time Our Ganger Dorothy DeBorba keeps jumping into a mud puddle, amusing the other children and irritating her mother, who keeps bathing her and changing her clothes. The last time this happens, she thinks it was Farina who pushed the little girl in — and falls in the mud herself.

Production and exhibition
Pups Is Pups was the first entry in the 1930-1931 season of shorts. It was the Our Gang debut for five-year-old Dorothy DeBorba, and for film score composer Leroy Shield. It is the first episode to feature the jazz-based background scoring that the Roach Studio comedies are known for. Some of the tunes included the "Hal Roach Happy Go Lucky Trio" (a.k.a. "Teeter Totter"), "Wishing", "Hide & Go Seek", "On To The Show", and "Confusion". The cues used on Hal Roach comedies are named after the first scenes they are used for. These tunes were used on other Hal Roach produced series at the time.

The striking and powerful industrial landscape framing the Gang's play activities at the beginning of the picture was achieved with a glass-matte process that added towering silo-shaped structures to the more bucolic live views of the Arnaz Ranch, a frequent Roach shooting location. This level of special effect—and budgetary expense—is unusual in Roach two-reelers.

Due to perceived racism toward African-Americans, several scenes featuring Farina were edited out of the Little Rascals syndicated television prints in 1971. They remained in 16mm, VHS and DVD home video releases. The scenes were reinstated in 2001 in the prints shown on American Movie Classics until 2003.

In 2004, Pups Is Pups was selected for preservation in the United States National Film Registry by the Library of Congress as being "culturally, historically, or aesthetically significant."

Cast

The Gang
 Norman Chaney as Chubby
 Jackie Cooper as Jackie
 Dorothy DeBorba as Dorothy
 Bobby Hutchins as Wheezer
 Allen Hoskins as Farina
 Mary Ann Jackson as Mary Ann
 The Hill Twins as Twins
 Buddy McDonald as Buddy
 Allen Tong as Our Gang member
 Wolfgang Weidler as Our Gang member
 Warner Weidler as Our Gang member
 Pete the Pup as Puppy

Additional cast
 Harry Bernard as Cop
 Allen Cavan – Dr. H. R. White
 William Gillespie – Musician playing bass tuba
 Charlie Hall – Orchestra leader playing violin
 Lyle Tayo – Dorothy's and Jackie's mother
 Charles McAvoy – Cement worker
 Silas D. Wilcox – Doorman
 Joe the Monkey as Monkey

See also
 Our Gang filmography

References

External links
Pups is Pups essay  by Randy Skretvedt at National Film Registry

Pups Is Pups comprehensive data page at Our Gang website The LuckyCorner.com
Pups is Pups essay by Daniel Eagan in America's Film Legacy: The Authoritative Guide to the Landmark Movies in the National Film Registry, A&C Black, 2010 , pages 170-171 

1930 films
1930 comedy films
Hal Roach Studios short films
United States National Film Registry films
American black-and-white films
Films directed by Robert F. McGowan
Our Gang films
Films with screenplays by H. M. Walker
1930s English-language films
1930s American films